Bethan Jane Miles (born 25 November 2003) is an English cricketer who currently plays for Buckinghamshire, Surrey and South East Stars. She plays primarily as a slow left-arm orthodox bowler.

Domestic career
Miles made her county debut in 2018, for Buckinghamshire against Oxfordshire in the Women's County Championship, taking 2/24 from her 10 overs. She went on to be her side's leading wicket-taker in the Women's Twenty20 Cup that season, with six wickets at an average of 27.16. The following season, she took eight wickets at an average of 14.12 in the Women's Twenty20 Cup. In 2020, she took eight wickets for the side in the East of England Women's County Championship. In the 2021 Women's Twenty20 Cup, Miles was the joint-fourth leading wicket-taker across the whole competition, with 11 wickets at an average of 4.45, as well as scoring her maiden county half-century, scoring 53* against Cambridgeshire. Later that season, she became dual-registered with Surrey, appearing for the side in the Women's London Championship. She appeared for both Buckinghamshire and Surrey in the 2022 Women's Twenty20 Cup, taking five wickets across the competition.

Miles was named in the South East Stars Academy squad for the 2021 season. She was again named in the academy squad for the 2022 season, but was added to the first team squad in July 2022. She made her debut for the side on 16 July 2022, against North West Thunder in the Rachael Heyhoe Flint Trophy, and took her List A best bowling figures, of 3/15 from her 6 overs.

International career
In October 2022, Miles was selected as a non-travelling reserve in the England Under-19 squad for the 2023 ICC Under-19 Women's T20 World Cup.

References

External links

2003 births
Living people
Place of birth missing (living people)
Buckinghamshire women cricketers
Surrey women cricketers
South East Stars cricketers